, more commonly known simply as Kōhaku, is an annual New Year's Eve television special produced by Japanese public broadcaster NHK. It is broadcast live simultaneously on television and radio, nationally and internationally by the NHK network and by some overseas (mainly cable) broadcasters who buy the program. The show ends shortly before midnight. Before the show began broadcasting on television in late 1953, the show was held on 3 January and only consisted of a radio broadcast.

The program divides the most popular music artists of the year into competing teams of red and white. At the end of the show, judges and the audience vote to decide which group performed better. The honor of performing on Kōhaku is strictly by invitation, so only the most successful singing acts in the Japanese entertainment industry can perform. In addition to the actual music performances, the costumes, hair-styles, makeup, dancing, and lighting are important. Even today, a performance on Kōhaku is said to be a big highlight in a singer's career because of the show's wide reach.

Song selection process
The songs and performers are examined by a selection committee put together by NHK. The basis for selection are record sales and adaptability to the edition's theme.

At the same time, a demographic survey is conducted regarding the most popular singers for each and what kind of music people want to hear. This and the song selection explain the amalgamation of the musical genres and its artists.

There are, however, exceptions to the process. Momoe Yamaguchi chose to sing her favorite song "Hito Natsu no Keiken" (ひと夏の経験) with its suggestive lyrics during the 25th edition, despite NHK's pick of a different song.

Show

When the show was first broadcast on radio in 1951, each team had a few performers, all of whom would perform within an hour. Since 1989, the program goes on for at least four hours as both teams, each having at least 25 performers, perform their songs.

At the end of the show, the audience and a panel of judges—notable celebrities who may or may not have a connection to the music industry—vote to select the winning team. In the past, the audience vote has been composed of a head count of the venue audience members, who could vote for either team (NHK Hall, which has been the venue for most Kōhaku editions since 1971, can seat 3,000 people). This counted as one vote.

As of the 54th (2003) and 55th editions (2004), viewers who watch the program through ISDB-S on NHK BS Hi-vision could vote by having their own head count in their respective households. Although it was still sketchy to determine in the 55th, the audience vote was counted as two votes: one for the venue audience and one for ISDB-S viewers.

The audience vote(s) are added to those of the judges who each have to vote for one team. The team with the most votes wins.

The above process was done differently for the 56th edition (2005). Instead, the NHK Hall head count, the vote count from cellphone users and the vote count from ISDB-S viewers each counted as one vote. As stated above, the team that got at least two votes won.

In the 57th edition (2006), aside from cellphone and ISDB-S viewers and the NHK Hall audience, 1seg users voted. Its format had been reverted to the ball voting system—from the audience head count and the judges' votes.

From the 58th edition (2007) to the 63rd edition (2012) and again in the 65th (2014), 66th (2015), and 68th (2017) through 70th editions (2019), the winner was determined through an overall head count, all from cellphone, ISDB-S viewers, 1seg users, and the NHK Hall Audience (including guests). Voting reverted temporarily to judges plus audience-unit votes in the 64th edition (2013) and 67th (2016) except that viewing audience votes (from internet, cellphone, digital TV, and 1seg voting) during halftime and end of show would each count as one vote and the NHK Hall head count as another single vote. The 71st edition (2020) featured off-venue voting only as there was no live audience in attendance due to concerns that arose from the COVID-19 pandemic in Japan. The 71st edition also saw performances emanating from multiple venues within NHK's studio premises with NHK Hall still the main staging area.

Aside from the performances, there are special performances where certain performers do their act together, the so-called "Ring Show" where performers from both teams take part in a "singing exercise," as well as performances from non-competing artists both in Japan and abroad. At the end of the show, all the performers sing "Hotaru no Hikari" (蛍の光) together. The song is based on the Scottish "Auld Lang Syne" that is commonly sung at New Year parties in the west. In addition, the 50th edition of the show included a "Countdown Special" to welcome the year 2000.

Results

* In the 56th edition, the roles of mediator and team host were blurred as all four hosts intermingled with both teams.
** Masahiro Nakai is the first male team host of the Red team since Teru Miyata in the 6th and 7th editions. Red team hosts (even in pairs) are usually female.
*** All five members of Arashi act as one host-unit, although at least one member would appear on stage to take the role. 
**** The hosts take a neutral position.

Popularity
Kōhaku was once the most-watched show on Japanese television of the year. One major factor was that New Year's Eve in Japan is a holiday traditionally spent at home (see Ōmisoka). Over the years, the annual event's popularity has declined from an all-time high of an 81.4 rating in 1963 to a low of 30.6 in the Kantō region for the first part of the 2006 event. The 2021 Kōhaku program set a record low for the second portion of the show with a 34.3 viewership rating in the Kantō region. Despite the drop, Kōhaku is consistently the top-rated musical event each year.

Outside Japan, Taiwan also hosts a similar Kōhaku competition, Super Star (超級巨星紅白藝能大賞), which broadcasts on the eve of Chinese New Year. Similar to Kōhaku, the special is held at a live venue, Taipei Arena. Unlike Kōhaku, Super Star does not have gender-affiliated teams and the special is pre-recorded weeks before airing instead of being a live broadcast. The first special premiered on February 13, 2010, the eve of the 2010's Chinese New Year. The most recent special was set to be broadcast on January 21, 2022.

Notable participants

Japanese entertainers 
The following is a list of acts with notable contributions to the Japanese entertainment industry, and have a minimum of five appearances on Kōhaku to their credit (appearance numbers in parentheses are as of the 73rd edition):

Pop, Rock, and Other Contemporary 

 Ai Otsuka (大塚 愛) (6)
 Aiko (13)
 AKB48 (12)
 Akiko Wada (和田 アキ子) (39)
 Akina Nakamori (中森 明菜) (7)
 Akira Fuse (布施 明) (25)
 Angela Aki (安藝 聖世美) (6)
 Arashi (嵐) (12)
 AAA (7)
 Aya Matsuura (松浦 亜弥) (5)1
 Ayaka (絢香) (8)
 Ayaka Hirahara (平原 綾香) (8)
 Ayumi Hamasaki (浜崎 あゆみ) (15)
 Ayumi Ishida (いしだ あゆみ) (10)
 Chemistry (5)
 Chisato Moritaka (森高 千里) (6)
 Da Pump (6)
 Daichi Miura (三浦 大知) (4)
 Dreams Come True (15)
 E-girls (5)
 Every Little Thing (8)
 Exile (12)
 Four Leaves (7)
 Gackt (5)
 Gen Hoshino (星野 源) (8)
 Goro Noguchi (野口 五郎) (11)
 Gospellers (6)
 Hideaki Tokunaga (德永 英明) (10)
 Hideki Saijō (西城 秀樹) (18)
 Hikaru Genji (6)
 Hiroko Moriguchi (森口 博子) (6)
 Hiromi Go (郷 ひろみ) (31)
 Hiromi Iwasaki (岩崎 宏美) (14)
 Hiromi Ōta (太田 裕美) (5)
 Ikimono-gakari (いきものがかり) (10)
 Ikue Sakakibara (榊原 郁恵) (6)
 Izumi Yukihara (雪村 いづみ) (10)
 Junko Sakurada (桜田 淳子) (9)
 Junretsu (純烈) (5)
 Kana Nishino (西野 カナ) (9)
 Kanjani Eight (関ジャニ∞) (11)
 Ken Hirai (平井 堅) (8)
 Kenji Sawada (沢田 研二) (17)
 King & Prince (5)
 Kobukuro (コブクロ) (7)
 Kome Kome Club (米米CLUB) (5)
 Kumi Koda (倖田 來未) (8)
 Kyōko Koizumi (小泉 今日子) (5)
 Kyū Sakamoto (坂本 九) (11)
 L'Arc-en-Ciel (5)
 Linda Yamamoto (山本 リンダ) (5)
 Masaaki Sakai (堺 正章) (6)
 Masaharu Fukuyama (福山 雅治) (15)
 Masahiko Kondō (近藤 真彦) (10)
 Masashi Sada (さだ まさし) (19)
 Masayuki Suzuki (鈴木 雅之) (5)
 Mayumi Itsuwa (五輪 真弓) (5)
 MAX (5)
 Mie Nakao (中尾 ミエ) (8)
 Miho Nakayama (中山 美穂) (7) 
 Mika Nakashima (中島 美嘉) (9) 
 Misia (7)
 Mizue Takada (高田 みづえ) (7)	 
 Momoe Yamaguchi (山口 百恵) (6)
 Morning Musume (モーニング娘) (10)
 Namie Amuro (安室 奈美恵) (9)
 Nana Mizuki (水樹 奈々) (6)
 Naoko Kawai (河合 奈保子) (6)
 Naoko Ken (研 ナオコ) (11)
 Naomi Sagara (佐良 直美) (13)
 Nogizaka46 (乃木坂46) (8)
 Perfume (15)
 Porno Graffitti (ポルノグラフィティ) (11)
 Rumiko Koyanagi (小柳 ルミ子) (18)
 Ryokuoushoku Shakai (緑黄色社会) (1)
 Ryōko Moriyama (森山 良子) (10)
 Saori Minami (南 沙織) (8)
 Sandaime J Soul Brothers (7)
 Seiko Matsuda (松田 聖子) (22)
 Sekai no Owari (6)
 Sexy Zone (6)
 Shinji Tanimura (谷村 新司) (16)
 Shizuka Kudo (工藤 静香) (8)
 Shonentai (8)
 SMAP (23)
 Superfly (6)
 T.M.Revolution (5)
 Tokio (24)
 Tomomi Kahara (華原 朋美) (5)
 Toshihiko Tahara (田原 俊彦) (7)
 W-inds (6)
 X Japan (8)
 Yo Hitoto (一青 窈) (5)
 Yōko Oginome (荻野目 洋子) (5)
 Yūzō Kayama (加山 雄三) (17)
 Yuzu (ゆず) (13)

1. Matsuura has also appeared with DEF.DIVA and GAM. However, NHK does not count those appearances towards her count.

Enka 

 Aki Yashiro (八代 亜紀) (23)
 Akira Kobayashi (小林 旭) (7)
 Aya Shimazu (島津 亜矢) (5)
 Ayako Fuji (藤 あや子) (21)
 Chiyoko Shimakura (島倉 千代子) (35)
 Frank Nagai (フランク 永井) (26)
 Fuyumi Sakamoto (坂本 冬美) (34)
 George Yamamoto (山本 譲二) (11)
 Harumi Miyako (都 はるみ) (29)
 Haruo Minami (三波 春夫) (50) 
 Hibari Misora (美空 ひばり) (18)
 Hideo Murata (村田 英雄) (27)
 Hiroshi Itsuki (五木 ひろし) (48)
 Hiroshi Miyama (三山 ひろし) (8)
 Ichirō Toba (鳥羽 一郎) (20)
 Kaori Kozai (香西 かおり) (19)
 Kaori Mizumori (水森 かおり) (20)
 Keiko Fuji (藤 圭子) (5)
 Kenichi Mikawa (美川 憲一) (26)
 Kiyoko Suizenji (水前寺 清子) (22)
 Kiyoshi Hikawa (氷川 きよし) (19)
 Kiyoshi Maekawa (前川 清) (18)
 Masako Mori (森 昌子)  (15)
 Masao Sen (千 昌夫) (19)
 Mina Aoe (青江 三奈) (18)
 Mitsuko Nakamura (中村 美律子) (15)
 Miyuki Kawanaka (川中 美幸) (24)
 Naomi Chiaki (ちあき なおみ) (9)
 Natsuko Godai (伍代 夏子) (22)
 Rimi Natsukawa (夏川 りみ) (6)
 Ryoko Shinohara (篠原 涼子) (2)
 Saburō Kitajima (北島 三郎) (50)
 Sachiko Kobayashi (小林 幸子) (33)
 Saori Yuki and Sachiko Yasuda (11)1
 Sayuri Ishikawa (石川 さゆり) (45)
 Shinichi Mori (森 進一) (48)
 Shizuka Kudo (工藤 静香) (9)
 Takao Horiuchi (堀内 孝雄) (17)
 Takashi Hosokawa (細川 たかし) (39)
 Uta (1)
 Yōko Nagayama (長山 洋子) (14)
 Yoshimi Tendo (天童 よしみ) (27)
 Yutaka Yamakawa (山川 豊) (11)

1. Saori Yuki and Sachiko Yasuda are counted as a duet. Solo appearances by either of the two would not count towards the duet count.

Foreigners
Although Kōhaku is made up of mostly Japanese entertainers, foreign artists (artists who are not Japanese nationals) popular in Japan have competed in the program. Special appearances, supporting musicians or other methods of participation where the artist or group's performance was not accounted for in the overall scoring should not be added to this list. Below is a list of artists or groups who have done so, categorized based on the country of origin (Asian or non-Asian) the person or majority of the members in a group are from, along with the editions:

Asian
South Korea
 BoA (53rd through 58th)
 Cho Yong-Pil (38th through 41st)
 Girls' Generation (62nd)
 Ive (73rd)
 Kara (62nd)
 Kye Eun-sook (39th through 45th)
 Lee Jung Hyun (55th)
 Le Sserafim (73rd)
 Patti Kim (40th)
 Ryu (55th)
 TVXQ (59th, 60th, and 62nd)
 Twice (68th, 69th, 70th and 73rd)
 Yonja Kim (40th, 45th, and 52nd)

Taiwan
 Vivian Hsu (49th)
 Chiu Pin-han of AKB48 Team TP (70th)
 Judy Ongg (30th and 31st)
 Ouyang Feifei (23rd, 24th, and 42nd)
 Teresa Teng (36th, 37th, and 42nd)

Philippines
 Smokey Mountain (42nd)
 Abby Trinidad of MNL48 (70th)
 Gary Valenciano (41st)

Hong Kong
 Agnes Chan (24th through 26th)
 Alan Tam (40th)

Thailand
 BNK48 (69th as a whole and 70th through Pimrapat "Mobile" Phadungwatanachok)
 Sita Teeradechsakul of CGM48 (70th)

China
 Liu Nian of AKB48 Team SH (70th)
 Twelve Girls Band (54th)

Other
 Khushi "Glory" Dua of DEL48 (India, 70th)
 JKT48 (Indonesia, 62nd as a whole and 70th through Shani Indira Natio)
 Dick Lee, Lim Hyung-joo, Xu Ke, and Amin (Singapore, South Korea, and China respectively, 56th)
 Oyunaa (Mongolia, 41st)
 Trần Cát Tường ("Anna") of SGO48 (Vietnam, 70th)

Non-Asian

United States
 Leah Dizon (58th)
 Chris Hart (64th and 65th)
 Jero (59th and 60th)
 Cyndi Lauper (41st)
 John Ken Nuzzo (53rd and 55th)
 James Shigeta (8th and 9th)
 Paul Simon (41st)
 The Ventures (42nd)
 Alyson Williams (41st)
 Andy Williams (42nd)

Other
 Sarah Brightman (United Kingdom, 42nd and 69th)
 Alfredo Casero (Argentina, 53rd)
 Alexander Gradsky (Russia, 41st)
 Márcia (Brazil, 41st)
 Laima Vaikule (Latvia, 42nd)
 Rosanna Zambon (Italy, 21st and 22nd)

References

External links
Kōhaku Uta Gassen Official Page (Japanese)
NHK Kōhaku on the NHK Digital Museum

NHK Kōhaku Uta Gassen
Music competitions in Japan
Japanese music television series
Japanese television specials
1953 Japanese television series debuts
New Year's television specials
Annual television shows
1950s Japanese television series
Music festivals in Japan
Japanese radio programs
1951 radio programme debuts